The North American blizzard of 2006 was a nor'easter that began on the evening of February 11, 2006. It dumped heavy snow across the Mid-Atlantic and New England states, from Virginia to Maine through the early evening of February 12, and ended in Atlantic Canada on February 13.

Meteorological synopsis

Since the heaviest snow was confined to a fairly small, but very heavily populated area, the storm was only ranked as a low-end Category 3 (Major) on the new Northeast Snowfall Impact Scale, which takes into account the area and population affected, as well as snowfall accumulations.  This indirectly also reflects the fact that casualties were extremely low and cleanup was fairly quick, even in the New York City area where the record snow amounts occurred. The main reasons for this are: A) The storm fell on a Sunday when many people can more easily stay home, B) the relatively small geographic area of extremely large snowfall, and C) Because the temperature was well below freezing throughout most of the storm, the snow was mostly dry and light in composition, as opposed to the wet and heavy snows that make some otherwise lesser storms much harder to clean up from and are more common at least in the coastal Northeast. Additionally, temperatures in the days after the storm were unseasonably warm in some spots (reaching the mid-50s °F in hard-hit New York City, and the mid 60s in DC) which helped melt the snow much more quickly than usual.

The storm system began developing on February 11 as a relatively minor system, bringing some snow along the southern Appalachian range. The low pressure center moved off-shore early February 12 before it began its rapid intensification. By early morning, snow began falling heavily, taking several forecasters by surprise who had expected about a foot of snow, at most, along the eastern fringes of the Atlantic seaboard. During the height of the storm on Sunday morning the 12th, thunder and lightning occurred as the snow fell.

The extreme intensification was partially the result of a fairly mild winter that kept water temperatures in the Atlantic a few degrees warmer than they normally are in February.

In addition to the heavy snow, coastal flooding from storm surge was reported, particularly in Massachusetts.

The low pressure area began forming in the Southern states a few days prior to the Blizzard striking, eventually merging with a northern stream system. A trough on the East Coast brought the system up the coast, and cold high pressure to the north eventually slowed the system to a crawl. As the system completed bombing, or rapid decrease in central pressure (a common measure of the strength of a storm), mesoscale banding features (areas of significant snowfall associated with smaller scale physical phenomena) impinged on the entire I-95 Corridor.

The low pressure center was so deep that somewhat of an eye actually formed. Rarely do eyes form on storms other than hurricanes, and it is especially rare in extratropical cyclones. NASA took a satellite picture of the eye of the storm; the eye was located south and east of southern New Jersey in this picture.

Impact

Three casualties occurred as a result of the snow: in Virginia, a man died due to his truck sliding off a highway; in Baltimore, a person died in a house fire as a result of snow delaying rescue workers from getting to the fire. A third fatality occurred in a weather-related accident in Nova Scotia.

Connecticut
While Connecticut was one of the hardest hit areas, the state was well-prepared for the storm and managed to avoid major problems. A total of  fell in the small Sandy Hook village. West Hartford totaled  and Fairfield saw  of snow. Despite the large amounts of snow, there were only isolated individual power outages. At the storm's onset, governor M. Jodi Rell ordered all tractor-trailer trucks off the state's highways to facilitate the efforts of highway crews with snow removal. Motorists whose vehicles were not equipped with 4-wheel drive were required to use snow chains to travel on state roadways during the storm. Connecticut mobilized 2,500 state-owned and privately contracted snowplows to keep state highways open during the storm. The state's 169 cities and towns employed hundreds of additional plows to keep local roads passable. Bradley International Airport was closed for several hours, and the storm disrupted service on Metro North.

Delaware
Kent and Sussex counties to the south mixed with rain for a while, and saw significantly less snow accumulations, mostly in the  range.

District of Columbia
The city of Washington, D.C. missed the worst of the storm. Approximately 3,000 people lost electricity in the District of Columbia. However, Ronald Reagan Washington National Airport (just across the Potomac River) was closed.

Maryland
The heaviest snow in Maryland fell from the northern suburbs of Washington, D.C., to the Baltimore area. These areas overwhelmingly saw over a foot of snow. This was the area's heaviest snow since the North American blizzard of 2003. Lesser amounts occurred in western and southern parts of the state.

Maryland was hardest hit by power outages. In the Baltimore area, more than 62,000 people lost electricity, plus another 16,000 in Montgomery County and 37,000 in Prince George's County.

Massachusetts
The most serious coastal problems were in Massachusetts. Logan International Airport in Boston and Barnstable municipal airport in Hyannis on Cape Cod saw over 90% of their flights cancelled at the peak of the storm.

There were no power outages, despite the conditions. There was one death; a tree fell onto a pickup truck in Billerica, killing the driver. Strong winds across the state caused $1.9 million in damage (2006 USD).

New Jersey
The impact of the blizzard in northern New Jersey was strong enough to stop the New Jersey Transit bus service between 7:30 a.m. and 4:00 p.m., although trains continued to run (with some delays). Many roads remained closed. Businesses were closed for most of the day. 16,000 people were without power in the state. Central and northeastern New Jersey saw the brunt of the storm due to heavy banding through the night into the morning:  of snow fell at Newark Airport and 27" fell in Rahway. The first Wicked Faire took place as scheduled.

New York

The New York metropolitan area received the brunt of the February Blizzard of 2006. All three of the airports in the New York City area (LaGuardia Airport, John F. Kennedy International Airport and Newark Liberty International Airport) were closed during the record blizzard, for the first time since the September 11, 2001 attacks. Like the Blizzard of 1996, this winter storm does not meet the criteria to be called a blizzard, however. The winds were not strong enough, and visibility was not poor enough. Thundersnow, which is a rare occurrence in New York, occurred for about a 4-hour period in parts of The Bronx, Manhattan, Brooklyn, Queens, Rockland and Westchester during the height of the storm early Sunday morning.

Central Park received  of snow, the largest amount for a single storm since records began, breaking the record of  that fell on December 26, 1947. By comparison, the blizzards of 1996 and 2003 dropped  in Central Park respectively. The smallest amounts of snowfall were recorded in portions of Nassau County, including the towns of Oceanside, Lynbrook, Rockville Centre and Island Park.
The snow removal cost in New York City alone is estimated at $27 million. It took nearly two days for utility crews to fully restore service to as many as 300,000 customers.

The storm did not reach very far north of the city; the Albany area only received  of snow. As a result, the 2005–06 winter season ended up being the first time ever since records began in the late 19th century that New York City received more snow than Albany in a given winter (the inland, upstate city averages about twice as much snowfall per winter as its big neighbor to the south).

The strong winds downed trees and powerlines, resulting in $3 million in damage (2006 USD).  The Long Island Rail Road reported extensive delays and as many as eight trains disabled up to several hours after the blizzard. The Monday morning commute was no better, as two of the railroad's lines were shut down completely and delays caused headaches for ambitious commuters. By Tuesday, two days after the storm, service was back to normal.

Despite the record snowfall, the New York City schools were open on February 13, owing to planning and work by the city and its snowplow team.

Pennsylvania
Philadelphia International Airport remained open throughout the storm, although about 50% of flights were cancelled. There were also power outages in the Philadelphia area, with about 10,000 customers losing power. But in contrast, in Western Pennsylvania most got  or less of snow. Philadelphia public and parchocial schools were closed for the day.

Rhode Island
The Governor of Rhode Island, Donald Carcieri, declared a statewide state of emergency due to the blizzard conditions. Generally, Providence County received the heaviest accumulations in the state (see the chart below). On February 12, the bulk of the snow ended around 5:00 p.m. Eastern Standard Time, with flurries lasting through the early evening. No significant power outages or injuries were reported.

Virginia

According to Dominion Power, over 64,000 people in Northern Virginia lost power in the storm, primarily in the suburban areas adjacent to Washington, D.C. Many locations in the extreme northeastern portion of the state recorded  of snow, with Falls Church and Fairfax coming in at  respectively. Fairfax County and eastern Loudoun County were generally the start of the 12+" (30+ cm) accumulations, which spread north towards Massachusetts.

Atlantic Canada
The worst of the storm was felt along the Atlantic coast, particularly in a swath around the Bay of Fundy, the Northumberland Strait and the south coast of Newfoundland. Some damage was reported as a result of the strong winds, particularly downed power lines but also some roof damage to buildings.

Observed accumulations

Not all observations are listed due to space limitations; only major communities and notable reports are listed.

Sources: National Weather Service local offices – Sterling, VA, Mount Holly, NJ, Upton, NY,
Taunton, MA, Caribou, ME, Gray, ME

See also
Cyclogenesis
Extratropical cyclone

References

External links

'Dangerous storm' slams Northeast, snarls travel — CNN (February 12, 2006)
'Winter storm hits Northeast, thousands lose power — CNN (Saturday, February 18, 2006)
Images from the storm

2006 meteorology
2006 natural disasters in the United States
Blizzards in the United States
Nor'easters
Blizzards in Canada
February 2006 events in North America
2006 in Canada